The 2017 PGA Tour Latinoamérica was the sixth season of PGA Tour Latinoamérica, having converted from the Tour de las Américas which ceased to operate in 2012. PGA Tour Latinoamérica is operated and run by the PGA Tour.

Schedule
The following table lists official events during the 2017 season.

Unofficial events
The following events were sanctioned by the PGA Tour Latinoamérica, but did not carry official money, nor were wins official.

Order of Merit
The Order of Merit was based on prize money won during the season, calculated in U.S. dollars. The top five players on the tour earned status to play on the 2018 Web.com Tour.

Developmental Series
The following table lists Developmental Series events during the 2017 season.

Notes

References

PGA Tour Latinoamérica
PGA Tour Latinoamerica